Shashi Preetam is an Indian film composer, music director, singer-songwriter, musician, filmmaker and philanthropist. He rose to fame as a composer with the film Gulabi, which became one of the greatest musical hits of the Telugu film industry. 

He has composed and given background scores for numerous Telugu and Hindi films. In June 2020, he suffered a heart attack and recovered after surgery.

Filmography

References

External links

Living people
Telugu film score composers
Musicians from Hyderabad, India
1970 births